Thierry Jonquet (January 19, 1954 – August 9, 2009) was a French writer who specialised in crime novels with political themes. He was born in Paris; his most recent and best known novel outside France was Mygale (1984), then published in the US in 2003 by City Lights. Mygale was also published in the UK as Tarantula in 2005 (Serpent's Tail). He wrote over 20 novels in French, including Le bal des débris, Moloch and Rouge c'est la vie.

Jonquet died aged 55 in hospital in Paris.

Tarantula was filmed by Spanish director Pedro Almodóvar, under the title The Skin I Live In, which was entered in competition in May 2011 for the Cannes Film Festival.

Bibliography
 Mémoire en cage (1982)
 Ils sont votre épouvante et vous êtes leur crainte (2006)
 Mon vieux (2005)
 Comedia (2005)
 Jours tranquilles à Belleville (2003)
 Le manoir des immortelles (2003)
 Ad vitam aeternam (2002)
 Le bal des débris (2000)
 Rouge c'est la vie (1998)
 Les orpailleurs (1998)
La Bête et la Belle (1985)
Mygale (1984, revised in 1995); in English translation by Donald Nicholson-Smith as Mygale (City Lights, 2003) and as Tarantula (Serpent's Tail, 2005)

References

External links
 Serpent's Tail page
 Portrait of Thierry Jonquet by Olivier Favier, flickr.
 Mygale Complete-Review
 Mygale - City Lights Book Description

1954 births
2009 deaths
Writers from Paris
French crime fiction writers
20th-century French novelists
21st-century French novelists
French male novelists
20th-century French male writers
21st-century French male writers